Robert Henry Mosely, Jr., sometimes written as Mosley, is an American singer, songwriter and producer. He has recorded singles as a solo artist as well as in the duo Mayme & Robert. Mosely is best known for co-writing the songs "Sha-La-La" and "Midnight Flyer".

Biography 
He recorded several singles at the end of the fifties and in the first half of the sixties,  as a solo singer as well as in the duo Mayme & Robert. In 1963 he issued "Crazy 'Bout My Baby" which was covered in Sweden by Tages. The B-side, "Goodbye My Lover Goodbye", was popular among some artists and was covered more than ten times. The Searchers that had an international hit with it, under the title "Goodbye My Love" in 1965, and Mosely's recording of the song was included on the soundtrack for the 2018 film Greenbook. Mosely was (co-)writer of these songs.

All together twelve of his (co-)compositions reached the Billboard Hot 100. Artists that recorded his music were, among others, Nat King Cole, Sarah Vaughan, The Shirelles, The Ventures, Pat Boone, Connie Francis, Patti Page, Manfred Mann and The Cats.

He worked together sometimes with Luther Dixon in these years.

Singles 
As solo singer
 1960: Not Until I Lost You / Just a Little More
 1960: Crazy Moonlight / Just About Time
 1963: Crazy 'bout My Baby / Goodbye My Lover, Goodbye
In Mayme & Robert
 1961: That's When / You Ought To Know
 Parting Tears
 Sweet Lips
 Ain't No Way in the World / Parting Tears

References
 Discogs, Robert Mosely (the piano player in the Charles Mingus Sextet is probably another musician, because it is stated here that he died in the fifties)

Year of birth missing (living people)
Living people
American male singers
American male songwriters
American record producers